Cacolo is a town and municipality in Lunda Sul Province in Angola. The municipality had a population of 31,895 in 2014.

References

Populated places in Lunda Sul Province
Municipalities of Angola